KREV (92.7 MHz) is an FM radio station licensed to Alameda, California, and serving the San Francisco Bay Area. It is owned by Golden State Broadcasting LLC, presently a debtor in possession.  The station was put into a receivership by court order in July 2020.  On March 15, 2021, VCY America, which owns Christian stations across the U.S., began operating the station under a local marketing agreement (LMA). On January 31, 2022, a court ordered possession and control of the station back to Golden State Broadcasting. 

KREV has an effective radiated power (ERP) of 6,000 watts.  The transmitter was formerly located atop of Bellaire Tower in the city's Russian Hill neighborhood.  It is now on a shared tower on Candlestick Hill in Bayview Park, San Francisco. The station's radio studios are in the Visitacion Valley district of San Francisco.

History

Jazz music as KJAZ
As KJAZ from August 1, 1959, to July 31, 1994, the station aired a jazz format. Founded by Pat Henry, KJAZ prided itself on broadcasting only jazz music, and a 1965 station brochure proclaimed KJAZ "Northern California's first and only fulltime jazz station".

In 1994, KJAZ was sold after owner Ron Cowan, in a financial crisis, deemed the station unprofitable. Since the demise of the jazz format, some KJAZ programmers and announcers have made their way to KCSM.

Since then, the KJAZ call sign has been used by various FM radio stations around the country and is currently the call sign for a silent station in Point Comfort, Texas owned by Fort Bend Broadcasting of Austin, Texas.

Rock music as KXJO
Though listeners mounted a fundraising effort to keep KJAZ on the air (by some reports raising $1.5 million), the station was sold in 1994, and on July 31, KJAZ was converted to "La Z" a Spanish music station, the first of many different format changes the station would go through in the mid-late 1990s. From 1999 to 2002, it simulcast the rock format of KSJO in San Jose as KXJO.

92.7 Party, and Power 92.7
On May 26, 2002, the 92.7 frequency's history as a dance music outlet would begin as KPTI, "92.7 PARTY," which was launched under former owner Spanish Broadcasting System. Nearly two years later, on March 17, 2004, it was sold to new owners, who flipped the format to mainstream urban as KBTB, "Power 92.7, The Beat of the Bay." Power 92.7 debuted on April 15, 2004 with 48 straight hours of songs by Tupac Shakur, a rapper from Oakland. After it failed to attract an audience, along with controversy from rival KMEL (which made headlines in the press) and on top of that, seeing the sale falling apart, the station was put up for sale again.

Energy 92.7
KBTB was acquired by Flying Bear Media, backed by Alta Communications and Tailwind Capital. CEO Joe Bayliss flipped the station back to dance music on October 2, 2004 as Energy 92.7. The station kept the KBTB call letters for several months before changing to KNGY, and kept the slogan The Beat of the Bay for over a year, but changed it to Pure Dance in 2006.

On July 17, 2005, KNGY moved its signal from its old tower on Russian Hill to the Sutro Tower, improving coverage in the South Bay, but later changed back to their old site due to signal issues. The effect was clear to South Bay listeners, who received a split signal between KNGY and KTOM, a country-format station from the Salinas area. In areas around the North Bay where line-of-site propagation is weak, listeners received a split signal between KNGY and KZSQ, a hot AC station from the Sonora, California area. Energy 92.7 was also heard on Comcast Digital Cable throughout the Bay Area on digital cable channel 964 and live online through the station's website.

KNGY was a reporter in Billboard Magazine's Dance/Mix Show Airplay panel and was the most-listened-to dance/electronic radio station on the West Coast.  KNGY as "Energy 92.7" offered a current-based mix of dance music, with Top 40, R&B remixes, disco and club classics from the 1970s, 1980s, and 1990s added into the presentation. It also broadcast sophisticated and mood-enhanced tracks including down-tempo groove, future jazz, electronic rock and chillout beats.

Under Bayliss, KNGY quickly built a reputation as "The Gay Station"—San Francisco's first commercial radio station that appealed openly to the Bay Area's large and highly influential gay community, with a number of on-air DJs—and even a sportscaster—who were openly gay. The station also became heavily involved in numerous gay-community events, including San Francisco's annual Gay Pride Parade in June. In fact, after Energy's demise in 2009, the station's morning show "Fernando and Greg in the Morning", which was widely popular with fans, was moved over to KMVQ.

In December 2005, former KLLC program director John Peake was hired as Energy's new program director, filling the vacancy left by Chris Shebel. Prior to coming to San Francisco pre-KLLC, Peake was the PD of influential Top 40 KRBE/Houston, Texas, a station that was also known for adding dance cuts into their traditional playlist. In July 2008, Peake resigned from the PD job, which would be quickly filled by Don Parker, who, like Peake, also has credentials in programming dance-leaning stations as he was the PD of Rhythmic contemporary outlet KKFR/Phoenix during its dance-intensive days in the late 1980s and mid-1990s.

On weekends, KNGY aired a show called "Ghetto House Radio" which aired every Saturday at midnight. The program featured a house/dance music mix with a mix of rap and "ghetto" music until 2a.m. Sunday morning, when Trevor Simpson's world town mix airs.

In February 2009, KNGY added former KGO talk show host Karel to their lineup. His program aired from 9p.m. to midnight Monday through Thursdays and it was the only time that the station did not play any music. However, after five months, Karel's program was dropped from the lineup in June 2009.

92.7 REV FM
In July 2009, Flying Bear announced that KNGY was sold to Ed Stolz's Royce International Broadcasting for $6.5 million. AllAccess reported that the station will become a CHR-format station with the new callsign KREV. According to a published report, Flying Bear was forced to sell the station after it was unable to renegotiate the terms of a $6 million loan held by a subsidiary of Wells Fargo Bank.

In September 2009, KNGY's on-air and production staff were given notice that they were being laid off, and PD Don Parker gave a short farewell to listeners on the afternoon of September 10. Energy's final song was "Walk Away" by Kelly Clarkson. At 9:08pm (PDT) that day, after a few false starts, KNGY's format was changed to Top 40 as "92.7 REV FM". The first song on "REV FM" was P!nk's "Get This Party Started."  The flip to Top 40 marks KREV's entry into an already interesting CHR race in the San Francisco Bay Area, where it will have to compete for listeners with CBS Radio's Mainstream Top 40 KMVQ, iHeartMedia's Top 40 powerhouse KYLD and their Urban CHR sister KMEL both of whom have more signal coverage than KREV. KREV's playlist, station imaging and web site are essentially identical to that of KFRH in Las Vegas, which is also KREV's sister station. On October 12, 2009, the once-controversial morning show The Dog House returned to the Bay Area airwaves on KREV.

To fill the hole left open by the flip of KNGY, KMVQ flipped the HD2 sub-channel to dance as "Pulse Radio" in 2010.

ASCAP lawsuit and attempted Receivership sale
From April 2016 to June 2018, on behalf of W.B. Music and other music companies, ASCAP successfully sued Royce International Broadcasting Corp. and its subsidiaries for copyright infringement. The result was a $330,000 judgment, increased to over $1.3 million with attorney fees and sanctions. 

After Defendants were unable to pay, KREV was transferred into a court-ordered receivership controlled by broker Larry Patrick on July 6, 2020, along with two other CHR stations mentioned in the lawsuit, KFRH in Las Vegas, and KRCK-FM in the Coachella Valley.

The Court Order appointing the Receiver authorized Larry Patrick to take control of the 3 named FM radio stations, and to "solicit offers for the sale of Defendants’ Radio Stations’ assets." However, that appointment order did not give Mr. Patrick control of the business entities. On December 30, 2020, it was announced that VCY America will acquire the three stations.

The December 28, 2020 Asset Purchase Agreement entered into by Larry Patrick has been criticized for being a "fire sale price" of $6 million for all three FM stations, and also because the contract was signed by "W. Lawrence Patrick, solely in his capacity as court-appointed receiver for Silver State Broadcasting LLC, Golden State Broadcasting LLC, and Major Market Radio LLC," while the appointment order clearly states that Patrick is receiver over the three FM stations only. 

On March 15, 2021, after Judge Jesus Bernal denied Stolz' bid to end the receivership and have the stations returned to him, VCY America began operating the three stations under aN LMA while the sale of the stations is being finalized.

The LMA, which costs VCY America $5,000 each month to operate all 3 FM stations, has been criticized for being underpriced. A comparable LMA for a San Francisco FM radio station was $80,000 per month for one station. As with the Asset Purchase Agreement, the LMA was entered into by Larry Patrick purportedly as receiver of the business entities, while the Order of Appointment states that Patrick is receiver over the FM radio assets only.

On January 31, 2022, federal Judge August B. Landis apparently quashed the sale of the stations by ordering Patrick to turn over control of KREV (and Stolz's two other FM stations) back to Stolz's companies. 

On October 28, 2022, KREV (FM) is back on air with a Dance format, under the name "Pirate Radio 92.7". Although Ed Stolz's Royce International Broadcasting is still considering selling KREV to fund its bankruptcy reorganization plan. The bidders will not be made public until a formal purchase officer is presented to the bankruptcy court.

References

External links

In the Spirit of KJAZ
 Energy 92.7 Weekly Charts
U.S. Dance Radio Post
U.S. Dance Radio Megamix

REV
Dance radio stations
Electronic dance music radio stations
Radio stations established in 1959